The Needles is a mountain ridge located within Olympic National Park in Jefferson County of Washington state.

Description

The peaks and pinnacles of The Needles are part of the Olympic Mountains and are situated within the Daniel J. Evans Wilderness. They are bounded by Mount Deception to the south and Gray Wolf Ridge to the north. Precipitation runoff from the ridge drains east into Royal Creek, and west into Gray Wolf River, which are both within the Dungeness River drainage basin. Old-growth forests of Douglas fir, western hemlock, and western redcedar grow on the lower slopes surrounding the peaks.

History

This geographical feature's descriptive name has been officially adopted by the U.S. Board on Geographic Names. The 1889–90 Seattle Press Expedition originally named it the "Holmes Range". The expedition, led by James Halbold Christie and Charles Adams Barnes, had also christened Mount Deception as "Mount Holmes", in honor of John H. Holmes of the Boston Herald.

Climate

Based on the Köppen climate classification, the Needles range is located in the marine west coast climate zone of western North America. Most weather fronts originate in the Pacific Ocean, and travel east toward the Olympic Peninsula. As fronts approach, they are forced upward by the peaks, causing moisture to drop in the form of rain or snowfall (Orographic lift). As a result, the range experiences high precipitation, especially during the winter months. During winter months, weather is usually cloudy, but due to high pressure systems over the Pacific Ocean that intensify during summer months, there is often little or no cloud cover during the summer. The months July through September offer the most favorable weather for visiting The Needles.

Summits
Principal summits of The Needles:

Gallery

Geology

The Olympic Mountains are composed of obducted clastic wedge material and oceanic crust, primarily Eocene sandstone, turbidite, and basaltic oceanic crust. The mountains were sculpted during the Pleistocene era by erosion and glaciers advancing and retreating multiple times.

See also

 Geology of the Pacific Northwest

References

External links
 The Needles photo: Flickr
 
 Weather forecast: Mountain Forecast

Mountain ranges of Washington (state)
Olympic Mountains
Mountains of Washington (state)
Landforms of Olympic National Park
Landforms of Jefferson County, Washington
North American 2000 m summits